Poselsky is a rural locality (a khutor) in Terkinskoye Rural Settlement, Serafimovichsky District, Volgograd Oblast, Russia. The population was eight as of 2010. There are two streets.

Geography 
Poselsky is located on the Archeda River, 53 km northeast of Serafimovich (the district's administrative centre) by road. Nikulichev is the nearest rural locality.

References 

Rural localities in Serafimovichsky District